WCCL (101.7 FM) is an American radio station physically located in Johnstown, Pennsylvania, but licensed to the community of Central City, Pennsylvania.  The oldies formatted station currently carries a syndicated feed of Westwood One's "Good Time Oldies" format.  The station is owned by Seven Mountains Media, LLC.

History

Beginnings as WCCS
For many years, this station was known as WYSN, "Sunny 101".  Licensed to Central City in Somerset County, the station first went on the air October 19, 1972 as WCCS, whose calls are used today by an AM station north of Somerset County in Homer City.  The original owner of the station was Central Broadcasting Company, with Ben Jones serving as the company's president.  The station initially played a mix of easy listening and country music, with polka programming on the weekends.

Coincidentally, the construction permit for WCCS in Homer City was once owned by the former Ridge Communications, this station's competitor, known then as WVSC (today as WNTI) and WVSC-FM (today as WLKJ).  Ridge Communications had sold the license for the Homer City Station in 1982 after failing to raise enough capital to put it on the air.

First Sale

The WCCS letters were given up in January 1981 for WWZE, after the station was sold to H.E.M.H. Corporation.  The station took on a more middle-of-the-road approach to its programming, but the polka show remained.  Jim Hancock served as company president, and Richard Eliot as general manager.

Second Sale

WWZE was purchased in 1988 by Nor-Lin Broadcasters, Inc., then the licensee of AM 1330 WADJ in Somerset, which itself was put on the air back in 1981.  Nor-Lin was a company headed by Johnstown radio and television legend Ron Lorence and his wife Norma.  Ron Lorence was a regular presence on WJAC-TV's locally produced shows such as "Seniors Today" and "Scholastic Quiz", and is still heard as the voice of Pennsylvania's Allied Milk Producers' radio commercials.  Upon acquisition, the call letters were changed to WYSN, and it took the on the moniker "Sunny 101".

Under Nor-Lin ownership, WYSN operated with a format of adult standards music provided by WestWood One's "Adult Standards" format, a rather unusual move for an FM station.  The station moved to a more current adult contemporary sound in the mid 1990s following a format change of crosstown competitor WVSC-FM from adult contemporary to contemporary country.  Ron Lorence managed the station, his wife Norma kept the books, and son Brad served as the station's operations manager, continuing in that role until long after the stations were sold.

Sale to Dame Media
Wanting to retire, Nor-Lin sold WADJ and WYSN in December 2000 to Dame Media, which had at the time owned WNTJ-AM and WMTZ-FM in Johnstown.  At Dame's request, Ron Lorence stayed on as general manager for about a year, primarily to assist Dame with the transfer of ownership.  Brad Lorence was promoted to station manager after his father decided it was time to retire for good, yet Brad Lorence still continued to do his live morning show over WYSN, which by this time has become WCCL, and had switched its format to oldies.

Lorence and Taylor fired: station sold
Without warning, Brad Lorence and morning show sidekick Jessica Taylor, who had been part of Somerset County morning radio for many years, were suddenly terminated in January 2004.  The Tribune-Democrat of Johnstown, which voted the duo as "Simply the Best Morning Radio Team" in a reader's survey, was bombarded with calls when listeners were suddenly informed that Lorence and Taylor were gone.  Two months later, the manager who activated the decision to fire the duo, Chuck Jewell, was also terminated.  Dame officials insisted the firing had nothing to do with Lorence and Taylor, that it was a cost-cutting measure.  Jessica Taylor by this time had gone on to country-formatted competitor Froggy 95.

The following year, Dame Media decided to sell its radio interests in Johnstown to Results Radio Group, which included WLKH 97.7 (formerly WVSC-FM), WCCL, and ESPN Radio 1330 in Somerset, also simulcast on 1490 in Johnstown.  Results Radio, recognizing the past success of Lorence and Taylor, brought Jessica Taylor back to the WCCL morning show, but without Brad Lorence, who went on to pursue other interests.  Jessica continued to do the morning show until July 2017 when she moved to sister station WKYE to do the Midday show due to health reasons.  Later in 2017, she vanished from the WKYE airwaves without explanation and has not been on the air since.  Brian Wolfe, former midday guy on Key 96.5 hosted the Cool Wake-Up Show until March 2020 when he was let go due to company-wide COVID-19 cutbacks.  He has since returned to the airwaves doing mornings on WKYE following Jack Michaels' retirement in August 2020.

WCCL today
Though WCCL is licensed to Somerset County, its studios and offices have been physically located in Johnstown since Dame Media purchased the station from the Lorence family.  The studios and offices remain there today.  In addition to playing oldies music, the station airs Pittsburgh Penguins hockey, Penn State Nittany Lions football, and local high school football. WCCL is also available online through their website and the Forever Media app. However, due to their contract with Penn State Athletics, WCCL cannot be heard online outside of the station's listening area during the College Football season.

Christmas Music
Every year during the months of November and December, Cool 101.7 drops the oldies and Good Time Oldies to play  " Cool" Christmas music.  The oldies format and Good Time Oldies returns at midnight on December 27.  During this time frame, they compete with WCRO for the Christmas music audience in Johnstown and the surrounding areas.

Forever Media Ownership
In November 2007, a deal was reached to sell WCCL plus co-owned stations WPRR, WBVH, and WLKH to Forever Broadcasting Inc. (Carol Logan, president) for a reported combined sale price of $3 million. The FCC approved the ownership thus allowing Forever Media, LLC to own the stations.

Sale to Seven Mountains Media
It was announced on October 12, 2022 that Forever Media is selling 34 stations, including WCCL and the entire Johnstown cluster, to State College-based Seven Mountains Media for $17.3 million. The deal closed on January 2, 2023.

References
Fans Angrily Protest Somerset, Pa., Radio Station's Firing of Popular Hosts.
Cost-Cuttitog Measures Continue at Johnstown, Pa.-Area Radio Station.

External links
Cool 101.7 WCCL official website

CCL
Radio stations established in 1972